Madura Mission or Madurai Mission is a Jesuit mission in South India dating from the time of Portuguese colonisation in the province of Goa, comprising the west coast down to Calicut and the interior districts of the Deccan and Mysore, and that of Malabar, being the area south of the peninsula encompassing the Malabar coast on the west, and the Coromandel coast on the east as far north as the River Vellar, including Cochin, Travancore, Madura, Tanjore, San Thome, and other contiguous districts. The term "Madura Mission" refers to that Jesuit missionary movement which had its starting point at Madura and extended thence over the eastern half of the peninsula.

History

Beginning and growth
Madura Mission owes its origin to Robert de Nobili, who commenced at Madura, in 1606, that peculiar method of incorporating the local custom and traditions in evangelizing. Shortly afterwards Father Antony de Vico, and Father Manoel Martins began imitating his mode of life and working on the same lines with considerable success. Father Vico died in 1638 and was succeeded by Fr. Sebastian de Maya, who in 1640 was imprisoned at Madura in company with de Nobili, while Father Martins remained at Trichy. In 1640 a new departure was made by Father Balthasar da Costa who began working specially for the lower castes. The success was such that in 1644 the total number of converts in the Madura, Trichy, and Satiamangalam districts rose to 3500, that is to say 1000 of the higher castes, and 2500 pariahs. At that time there were five priests working on the mission. Subsequent progress was still more gratifying, for in 1680 the number of converts altogether was reckoned at no less than 80,000. The number of workers, however, did not increase in proportion; they generally amounted to seven to ten, and only as late as 1746 reached to fourteen. Among these the most successful were Father Balthasar da Costa and Manoel Martins already mentioned, Andrew Freyre, Bl. John de Britto, Francis Laynes, Venance Bouchet, Peter Martin, and Father Beschi.

End and Succeeding missions
The expulsion of the Jesuit Order from Portuguese territory in the year 1759 put an immediate check on the supply of missionaries, but the fathers already in the mission, being outside the Portuguese dominions, were able to continue their work though with diminishing numbers. The entire suppression of the Order in 1773, however, brought the Jesuit regime to an end. Three years later (1776) a new mission of the Karnatic was established by the Holy See, under the Paris Seminary for Foreign Missions, which, taking Pondicherry as its center, gradually extended its labors inwards as far as Mysore, and to the old Madura Mission. Under the Foreign Mission Society the remaining Jesuit Fathers continued to work till they gradually died out. Not much in the way of missionary work was done by the Goan clergy, who took the place of the Jesuits in certain stations, and the results previously gained were in prospect of being almost totally lost.

In the year 1836 the Karnatic mission was erected into the Vicariate Apostolic of the Coromandel Coast; and as the, Foreign Mission Society could not for want of men come to the rescue of Madura, they willingly accepted the appointment of the Jesuits in the same year - the Society having been restored in 1814. In 1846 the Madura Mission was in turn made into a vicariate Apostolic with Jesuit Msgr. Alexis Canoz as its first vicar Apostolic; but the portion north of the Cauvery was retained by Pondicherry. In 1886, on the establishment of the hierarchy, the Madura Vicariate was made the Diocese of Trichy. In 1893 Tanjore was taken away and given to the Padroado Diocese of Mylapore. In the same year the Trichy Diocese was finally made suffragan to Bombay.

References

Further reading

Jesuit Asia missions
Christian missions in India
Madurai